Willem Anton van Vloten (Bandung, 7 June 1941) is a Dutch dermatologist.

Van Vloten studied medicine at the University of Leiden where he graduated on 19 June 1974. He was appointed as a professor of dermatology and venereology in 1980. Later he was appointed as a dermatology professor at the University of Utrecht on 8 November 1984 and worked there till 1 June 2001.

In 1999, he won the Van Vlissingenprijs of the Foundation 'Ank van Vlissingen Fonds' which is given to persons and institutions which contributed much to the research of the causes and treatment of malignant lymph node diseases and the improvement of the quality of life of the patients who suffer from such afflictions.

Works
 De betekenis van DNA cytofotometrie voor de vroegtijdige diagnostiek van mycosis fungoides (thesis Rijksuniversiteit van Leiden)
 Dermatologie en venereologie, W.A. van Vloten, H.J. Degreef, E. Stolz, B.J. Vermeer, R. Willemze (editor) 
 Het geslacht van Vloten. Genealogie met biografische aantekeningen., W.A. van Vloten, Th.J. van Vloten, Wageningen 1995

See also
Van Vloten (family)

References

Dutch dermatologists
Leiden University alumni
Academic staff of Leiden University
Academic staff of Utrecht University
People from Bandung
1941 births
Living people
20th-century Dutch physicians